WSJV (channel 28) is a television station licensed to Elkhart, Indiana, United States, serving the South Bend area as an affiliate of the digital multicast network Heroes & Icons. It is owned by Gray Television alongside NBC affiliate WNDU-TV (channel 16). Both stations share studios on the University of Notre Dame campus along State Road 933 on South Bend's north side, while WSJV's transmitter is located on Johnson Road in Penn Township in St. Joseph County.

History

Early history

WSJV began broadcasting on March 15, 1954, on channel 52. It was initially an NBC affiliate, with a secondary ABC affiliation. The South Bend–Elkhart market was unique because it was a UHF island; it was sandwiched between Chicago (channels 2, 5, 7, 9, and 11) to the west, Milwaukee (channels 4, 6, 10, and 12) to the northwest, Grand Rapids–Kalamazoo–Battle Creek (channels 3, 8, and 13) to the north, Lansing–Jackson (channels 6 and 10) and Detroit (channels 2, 4, and 7) to the northeast, Toledo (channels 11 and 13) to the east, and Indianapolis (channels 4, 6, 8, and 13) to the south, meaning that no VHF licenses could be assigned to South Bend. It was owned by the Dille family and their Truth Publishing Company, which owned Elkhart's main newspaper, The Elkhart Truth and WTRC radio (AM 1340 and FM 100.7. When WNDU-TV signed on in July 1955, it took the NBC affiliation, leaving WSJV to become the first primary ABC affiliate in Indiana. WSJV's studios were on County Road 7 in Concord Township in Elkhart County, with an Elkhart postal address.

Until 1971, WSJV was the de facto ABC affiliate for the southern part of the Grand Rapids market, as that city's ABC station, WZZM-TV, could not be seen in much of the area. This ended when WUHQ-TV (channel 41, now WOTV) signed on from Battle Creek in 1971.

WSJV moved its channel allocation to channel 28 in 1958. After the station invested in purchasing color tape and film equipment, WSJV began broadcasting in color in 1966, five years after ABC began airing some of its programs in color in 1961. WSJV eventually bought two color television cameras, and began airing all of its locally produced shows in color in 1968. In 1971 and 1972, its studios were completely remodeled and enlarged.

In 1974, Truth Publishing sold WSJV to Quincy Newspapers after the FCC began tightening its cross-ownership rules to forbid common ownership of a newspaper and a broadcasting outlet in the same market, except in a few grandfathered cases. While the FCC granted grandfathered status to Schurz Communications for its combination of the South Bend Tribune and WSBT-AM-FM-TV, it would not do the same for Truth Publishing's combination of The Truth, WTRC-AM-FM, and WSJV. As a result, Truth Publishing was forced to divest WSJV.

As a Fox affiliate

In December 1993, Fox gained the broadcast rights to televise games from the NFL's National Football Conference, which firmly established Fox as the fourth national network. As a result of the deal, Fox sought to upgrade its affiliates in several markets over the next three years, moving Fox affiliations in several markets to longtime affiliates of the Big Three television networks, generally those with established news departments. The network wanted to air programming on a full-power station in the area, especially in hopes of reaching more of the Chicago Bears' fan base; the Bears have long considered Michiana to be a secondary portion of their home territory. Fox reached an agreement with WSJV to join the network on April 21, 1995; prior to the agreement, some Fox programming had been airing on CBS affiliate WSBT-TV, while the Fox prime time schedule and Fox Kids were seen on network-owned WFLD in Chicago and/or WFFT-TV in Fort Wayne on the Indiana side, or WXMI in Grand Rapids and/or WKBD-TV in Detroit (until December 1994, when it was replaced by WJBK) on the Michigan side, all of which were piped in on Michiana cable systems.

On October 18, 1995, WSJV affiliated with Fox after a 40-year stint as an ABC affiliate, while W58BT signed on and took the ABC affiliation (that station is now WBND-LD, which moved from UHF channel 58 to channel 57 in 2002 to allow WSJV to use that channel for its pre-transition digital signal). Before the switch, WSJV was the longest-tenured ABC affiliate in the state of Indiana; an honor now held by WPTA in Fort Wayne. ABC was not pleased with WSJV's defection, and was particularly angered at being relegated to a low-power station in South Bend.

In an act of retribution against Quincy, the network pulled its programming from WREX in Rockford, Illinois; which had recently been acquired by Quincy. ABC moved its Rockford affiliation programming to WTVO; it had recently made a significant investment into WTVO's owner, Young Broadcasting.

Loss of Fox affiliation
In June and July 2016, the station's general manager and news director stepped down and moved to other Quincy Media stations; the South Bend Tribune reported the possibility that Quincy was planning to shut down WSJV and consolidate its Fox affiliation onto another station in the market, so it could sell WSJV in the FCC's upcoming spectrum incentive auction—which will allow stations to relinquish their broadcast spectrum to the FCC in exchange for a share of the profit from its resale to wireless providers as part of a reallocation process. Spectrum is said to be valuable from the South Bend market due to its proximity to several major markets such as Chicago and Indianapolis.

On July 25, 2016, Quincy announced the transfer of the Fox affiliation rights to Sinclair Broadcast Group's WSBT-TV in exchange for the ABC and CW affiliations in Peoria, Illinois from Sinclair-owned WHOI. WSBT then announced that they would be replacing its two subchannels with Fox Michiana, beginning on August 1, 2016. For a 60-day transition period until September 30, WSBT-DT2 was simulcast by WSJV to allow viewers to transition from the former signal, along with pay television providers. After the transfer of affiliation, Quincy donated the station's entire news and tape archive to the libraries of Indiana University Bloomington, specifically its Moving Image Archive.

After the end of the transition period, WSJV became mostly a pass-through for the Heroes & Icons network, which had previously aired on the station's second digital channel. The station's staff was reduced to an FCC-minimum skeleton crew of two employees (one engineer and one manager) with most of its employees being transferred to other Quincy Media stations, WSBT, or laid off. In the end, however, WSJV's spectrum was not sold, and the station continued to operate as a Heroes & Icons affiliate with minimal staff. In the spring of 2019, Quincy expanded the number of subchannel networks the station carried through various group deals made with those network owners. With the repeal of the FCC's Main Studio Rule in the same year, the mostly-vacant Concord Township studio facility was shuttered, and the skeleton crew released. The station was then automated and engineered out of Quincy's flagship station in Quincy, Illinois, WGEM-TV.

Sale to Gray Television
On February 1, 2021, Gray Television, owner of NBC affiliate WNDU-TV, announced its intent to purchase Quincy Media for $925 million in a cash transaction. As WSJV is lower ranked than the top four stations in ratings in the South Bend market (not counting Weigel's low-power triopoly, but WHME), Gray sought a failing station waiver to permit common ownership of both WSJV and WNDU-TV. The sale was completed on August 2.

News operation
As a Fox affiliate, WSJV broadcast 21 hours of locally produced newscasts each week (with four hours each weekday and 30 minutes each on Saturdays and Sundays).

After gaining the Fox affiliation in August 1995, WSJV revamped its local news offerings. Unlike most former Big Three affiliates that joined Fox in the 1990s, WSJV did not retain a news schedule similar to the one it had as an ABC affiliate. Local news programming began running on weekdays from 6:00 to 8:00 a.m. (the morning newscast being extended by one hour and syndicated programming filling the 8:00 a.m. hour to fill timeslots vacated by the departure of Good Morning America; it was later expanded until 9:00 a.m. several years later). The 5 and 6 p.m. newscasts were dropped and replaced with syndicated programming, while the 11 p.m. newscast was moved to 10 p.m., airing for the full hour. The result was a news schedule that partly resembled the common newscast scheduling of most of the network's early affiliates that, then as now, relied more heavily on syndicated programming. A half-hour 5 p.m. newscast was later added to the schedule by the mid-2000s, but was cancelled in 2008.

The station began having competition to its weeknight prime time broadcast on September 5, 2006 after CBS affiliate WSBT-TV (channel 22) added its own weeknight 10:00 p.m. newscast on its second digital subchannel after WSBT-DT2 converted into an independent station. On January 19, 2012, WSJV became the fourth and last television station in the South Bend market to begin broadcasting its local newscasts in high definition. WSJV's newscast also competed with a nightly half-hour 10:00 p.m. newscast on CW affiliate WCWW-LD (channel 25) produced WBND-LD.

Following the trading of the Fox affiliation to WSBT-TV, WSJV ceased production of local news; the news department formally ceased operations following the edition of July 29, 2016 of Fox 28 News at 10:00. News production for South Bend's Fox station was taken over by WSBT, which retained some of the former staff from WSJV, while others either went to sister station WPTA in Fort Wayne or just simply retired from the broadcasting industry.

Technical information

Subchannels
The station's digital signal is multiplexed:

Analog-to-digital conversion
WSJV shut down its analog signal, over UHF channel 28, on February 17, 2009, the original target date in which full-power television stations in the United States were to transition from analog to digital broadcasts under federal mandate (which was later changed to June 12, 2009). The station's digital signal relocated from its pre-transition UHF channel 58, which was among the high band UHF channels (52-69) that were removed from broadcasting use as a result of the transition, to its analog-era UHF channel 28 for post-transition operations.

References

External links

Television channels and stations established in 1954
SJV
Gray Television
1954 establishments in Indiana
Heroes & Icons affiliates
True Crime Network affiliates
Ion Mystery affiliates
Court TV affiliates
Quest (American TV network) affiliates
Bounce TV affiliates
Dabl affiliates